Prospect is a Canadian coastal community on the Chebucto Peninsula in Nova Scotia, Canada within the Halifax Regional Municipality.

During the American Revolution, fishermen at Prospect captured an American Privateer and 23 crew members.

In 2003, the town was hit by the eye of Hurricane Juan. Wind damage was substantial and storm surge washed away many wharfs and stages, but no homes. The area suffered significant land erosion due to the impact.

Electoral districts
Federal- South Shore-St. Margarets
Provincial- Timberlea-Prospect
Municipal - Historically: District 22: Timberlea Prospect

There are no churches in Prospect since the closing of Our Lady of Mt. Carmel. Nearby are St. Joseph (Shad Bay), New Life Community Church (Hatchet Lake), St. Timothy's (Brookside), and St. James (Goodwood).

Notable residents 
Charles Robinson (Medal of Honor)

References

External links

Prospect Genealogical Website
HRM Civic Address Map

Communities in Halifax, Nova Scotia
General Service Areas in Nova Scotia
Populated places established in 1754
1754 establishments in the British Empire